Callitriche christensenii is a species of plant in the family Plantaginaceae. It is endemic to Saint Helena.  Its natural habitats are rivers, freshwater marshes, and freshwater springs.

References

christensenii
Least concern plants
Flora of Tristan da Cunha
Freshwater plants
Taxonomy articles created by Polbot